This article contains information about the literary events and publications of 1515.

Events
Christoph Froschauer becomes the first printer in Zürich.

New books

Prose
Martin of Arles –

Drama
c. 1514–15 – Gian Giorgio Trissino – Sophonisba

Poetry

Alexander Barclay (translated from Baptista Mantuanus) – Saint George
John of Capistrano – Capystranus (published in London)
Approximate year – Stephen Hawes –

Births
March 28 – Teresa of Ávila, Spanish Carmelite mystic, saint and poet (died 1582)
Unknown dates
Nicolas Denisot, French poet and painter (died 1559)
Brne Karnarutić, Croatian poet and writer (died 1573)
Ambrosius Lobwasser, Saxon humanist, translator and psalmist (died 1585)
Johann Weyer, Dutch occultist (died 1588)
probable
Roger Ascham, English scholar (died 1568)
William Baldwin, English writer, editor and theatrical director (died c. 1563)

Deaths
February 16 – Aldus Manutius, Italian printer-publisher and poet (born 1449)
unknown date Jacques Almain, French theologian (year of birth unknown)

References

1515

1515 books
Years of the 16th century in literature